Events from the year 1834 in Denmark.

Incumbents
 Monarch – Frederick VI
 Prime minister – Otto Joachim

Events
 1011 A fire destroys much of Hillerød

Undated

Sports

Date unknown
 Ajax København is founded.

Births
 15 July – Hans Peter Johan Lyngbye (died 1920)
 4 December – Carl Lange, physician and psychologist (died 1900)

Deaths
 4 September – Peter Erasmus Müller, bishop (born 1776)

References

 
1830s in Denmark
Denmark
Years of the 19th century in Denmark